Wierzbnica may refer to the following places in Poland

Wierzbnica, Lubusz Voivodeship
Wierzbnica, West Pomeranian Voivodeship